Carolyn Harris (born 1960) is a British politician.

Carolyn Harris may also refer to:
 Carolyn Harris (librarian) (1948–1994), American librarian
 Carolyn Wilson Harris (1849–1910), American lichenologist

See also
 Paul Banks and Carolyn Harris Preservation Award, named in part for the librarian